Olenivka is an urban-type settlement in Kalmiuske Raion, Donetsk Oblast, eastern Ukraine, 20.5 km southwest from the center of the city of Donetsk. It had a population of

History 
Beginning in April 2014, the ongoing Russo-Ukrainian war and war in the Donbas has brought both civilian and military casualties.

Since 2014, the town is controlled by the separatist Donetsk People's Republic.

See also 

 Olenivka prison explosion, 29 July 2022
 Territorial control during the Russo-Ukrainian War

References

External links

 Weather forecast for Olenivka

Urban-type settlements in Kalmiuske Raion